The Carlisle Bridge is the main railway bridge crossing the River Lune at Lancaster, Lancashire, England, carrying the West Coast Main Line over three  spans. This section of the railway, including the original version of the bridge, was the work of Thomas Brassey, William Mackenzie, and John Stephenson; it was built between 1844 and 1846 and opened in 1847. There is a walkway for public use attached to the east side of the bridge.

References

External links

Bridges across the River Lune
Bridges in Lancaster, Lancashire
Transport in the City of Lancaster